Karla Schramm (February 1, 1891 – January 17, 1980), was an American film actress. A lifelong resident of Los Angeles, California, she was the second actress to play Jane Porter, mate of Tarzan, in motion pictures.

She first appeared in the 1920 production The Revenge of Tarzan opposite Gene Pollar as Tarzan. Later that year she played the same role in the movie serial The Son of Tarzan, this time opposite P. Dempsey Tabler as the Apeman.

She and Brenda Joyce were the only women to play Jane opposite two different Tarzans.

Filmography

His Majesty, the American (1919) (uncredited)
The Revenge of Tarzan (1920) - Jane Porter
The Son of Tarzan (1920) - Jane Porter

External links

American silent film actresses
1980 deaths
1891 births
20th-century American actresses